Makin Island may refer to:

Places
 Butaritari, an atoll in Kiribati known to U.S. military forces during World War II as "Makin Atoll" and "Makin Island"
 Makin (atoll), the local, and now preferred, name for an atoll in Kiribati adjacent to Butaritari, known to U.S. military forces during World War II as "Little Makin"

Ships
 , a United States Navy escort aircraft carrier in commission from 1944 to 1946
 , a  United States Navy amphibious assault ship commissioned in 2009

See also
 Makin (disambiguation)
Makian, a volcanic island in Indonesia